Resculum was a fort in the Roman province of Dacia.

See also
List of castra

Notes

External links

Castrul roman Bologa - reportaj sapaturi arheologice (in Romanian)
Roman castra from Romania - Google Maps / Earth

Roman legionary fortresses in Romania
Ancient history of Transylvania
Historic monuments in Cluj County